Leser v. Garnett, 258 U.S. 130 (1922), was a case in which the Supreme Court of the United States held that the Nineteenth Amendment had been constitutionally established.

Prior history
On August 26, 1920, the ratification of the Nineteenth Amendment to the United States Constitution was certified by Secretary of State Bainbridge Colby.  The amendment reads as follows:

Case
The Supreme Court granted certiorari to decide "Whether the Nineteenth Amendment has become part of the federal Constitution."  The plaintiffs disputed the constitutionality of the amendment through three claims:

 The power to amend the Constitution did not cover this amendment, due to its character.
 Several states that had ratified the amendment had constitutions that prohibited women from voting, rendering them unable to ratify an amendment to the contrary.
 The ratifications of Tennessee and West Virginia were invalid, because they were adopted without following the rules of legislative procedure in place in those states.

In a unanimous decision, written by Justice Louis Brandeis, the court addressed each objection in turn.

In response to the first objection, the court declared that since the Fifteenth Amendment had been accepted as valid for more than fifty years, and dealt with a similar matter (in this case, that voting rights could not be denied on account of race), it could not be argued that the new amendment was invalid due to its subject matter.

In response to the second objection, the court decided that when the state legislatures ratified the amendment, they were operating in a federal capacity as laid down in the Constitution, a role which "transcends any limitations sought to be imposed by the people of a state."

As far as the ratifications of Tennessee and West Virginia were concerned, the court remarked that the additional ratifications of Connecticut and Vermont after the proclamation of the amendment rendered the point moot, but the court also addressed the substance of the objection.  The court found that as the Secretary of State had accepted the ratifications by the legislatures of the two states as valid, they were valid, effectively ruling the matter as non-justiciable.

See also
List of United States Supreme Court cases, volume 258

References

External links

See photo .tiff files of all decisions as the case progressed through the courts:  http://msa.maryland.gov/megafile/msa/speccol/sc5300/sc5339/000041/000000/000012/unrestricted/021064.tif

1922 in United States case law
Gender discrimination lawsuits
United States Supreme Court cases
United States Nineteenth Amendment case law
United States Constitution Article Five case law
United States Supreme Court cases of the Taft Court